Lafarge is a railway station in Lafarge, Nouvelle-Aquitaine, France. The station is located on the Limoges-Bénédictins - Périgueux railway line. The station is served by TER (local) services operated by SNCF.

The station is primarily for Saint-Hilaire-les-Places, 2 km away.

Train services
The following services currently call at Lafarge:
local service (TER Nouvelle-Aquitaine) Limoges - Thiviers - Périgueux - Bordeaux

References

Railway stations in Haute-Vienne